The equal-armed cross, also referred to as the square cross, the balanced cross, and the peaceful cross, is a name for the Greek cross when this is found in ancient cultures, predating Christianity.

Significance
It is often interpreted as representing either the four seasons, four winds, four elements, or some other aspect of physical nature.

Other
An equal-armed cross (often within a circle) represents the planet Earth in traditional astrological/astronomical symbols. The cross could also be used to represent the union between male and female.

See also
Christian cross
Christian symbols
Swastika

References

Cross symbols